Amanita prairiicola is a fungus native to western North America from Arizona to Oregon and eastward to Kansas. One specimen has been described in Argentina, though it may have been imported with soil. Unlike most Amanita species, it doesn't appear to need a mycorrhizal host and has been found in areas with no potential for a host, such as open cultivated fields and deserts. The cap is white, six to twenty centimeters across, and usually flat to convex. The gills are cream to gold colored, free, crowded, and broad. The stalk is fifteen to twenty by two to four centimeters, and is also cream colored.

References

prairiicola
Fungi of North America